Lee Hun Jai (born April 17, 1944) is a South Korean politician who served as the acting Prime Minister of South Korea twice, from May 19, 2000, to May 22, 2000, and from July 25, 2004, to July 30, 2004. Both times others were nominated to officially take that position and were confirmed by Parliament, while Lee was meant only as a temporary placeholder. Lee does not belong to any political party.

Education
Lee was born in Shanghai, China on April 17, 1944. He graduated from Kyunggi High School in 1962, and Seoul National University with a bachelor's degree in Law in 1966. Lee also earned his master's degree in Economics from the College of Economics at Boston University in 1981 and MBA from Harvard Business School in 1982.

Career
After passing the 6th Examination for Higher Civil Service in 1968, Lee joined the Planning and Management of the Finance Ministry in 1969. He soon distinguished himself, helping to avert a currency crisis in 1973 which resulted from an oil shortage. He left the finance ministry in 1981 and rejoined the government later. He served as chairman of the South Korean Securities and Exchange Commission from 1991 to 1996 and as chairman of the Financial Supervisory Commission from 1998 to 2000. While in these positions he was known as a ruthless business and banking reformer. In January 2000 he became finance minister for the first time and served in that position until August 2000. In February 2004 he became deputy prime minister and also became finance minister again. On March 7, 2005, he announced his resignation from these positions after he was implicated in a real estate scandal. He left office a week later after his replacement was chosen.

References

External links
  이헌재 at Nate people

1944 births
Living people
South Korean Roman Catholics
Seoul National University School of Law alumni
Finance ministers of South Korea
Government ministers of South Korea
Harvard Business School alumni
Deputy Prime Ministers of South Korea
Jeonju Yi clan
Boston University alumni
Winners of the Nikkei Asia Prize